Khadda is a town, a Nagar panchayat and a Tehsil in Kushinagar district in the Indian state of Uttar Pradesh. It is situated approximately 8 km from the border of Bihar and 18 km from the India-Nepal border.

Khadda has a sugar factory, government-run intermediate-colleges, one post-graduate college, cinema-halls, bus station, railway station and good market place.

Geography
Khadda is home to Jatashankar Pokhara, which is situated in the heart of the town. The Gandaki River, a tributary of the Ganges, passes 4 km from the town.

Agriculture
Khadda is an agricultural hub and is a big producer of sugar cane, bananas, wheat, and rice. Sugar cane is the most significant crop, with the Khadda factory in operation since 1949.  Banana plantations are increasingly popular and cover approximately 200 hectares. The production of bananas is very famous here and the crop is exported domestically and internationally. Khadda has a large produce market. Additionally, fruits and vegetables are exported to Bihar, Nepal and Gorakhpur city. Khadda is also known for the high milk production from its nearby 35 villages, with total production on average per day of 50,000 liters. Seventy percent of the population in Khadda is dependent on farming and production of these products.
Gandak canal and Badi Gandak river are major source of irrigation, but during rainy season this river sometimes converts in a heavy flood. Many villages near Khadda affected by this river also called Narayani river

Paniyahawa Bridge is a railway and national highway road bridge connecting Uttar Pradesh, Bihar and Nepal. Its also known as Mini Goa of Khadda. People mostly visit this place as picnic spot and enjoy fish curry which is a famous food available here. A special kind of silver fish called Chepua is found in this region. local sweet 'Pera' made by pure milk and sugar is also very famous here. This is located 8 km from Khadda.

Madanpur Devi Temple is a temple belonging to goddess Durga. It is one of the famous temples in this region and people from different states and places come here in the months of April and October in Navratri season to receive the blessing of Mata Rani. This is located 13 km from Khadda.

The Valmiki Tiger Reserve is situated in the forest of Bihar with the main purpose of tiger breeding. This forest has a variety of animals and birds and full of greeneries and herbal plants. This is located 16 km from Khadda.

Transport
Khadda is connected with the NE Railway route connecting Muzzafarpur in Bihar and Gorakhpur in U.P. The Station Code of KHADDA Railway is KZA. It connects to the major cities in India like Gorakhpur, Lucknow, Delhi, Amritsar, and Bandra.

Khadda is well connected with NH 28B. This highway is connected from Kushinagar and goes towards Bihar and Nepal.

Climate
The Khadda Town enjoys 4 types of weather: winter, spring, summer and rainy season.

How To Reach
Khadda Railway Station is approximately 80 km apart from Gorakhpur Railway Station by Railway route. There are 18 trains that stop at Khadda from both sides up and down. You can also reach here from Gorakhpur by road (National Highway) via Kasia-Kushinagar-Padrauna-Naurangiya-Nebua-Bhujauli-Mathiya-Khadda, it is approximately 110 km. Another road is via Pipraich, Kaptanganj, Siswa Bazar to Khadda. It is approximately 85 km.

Demographics
As of the 2011 Indian census, Khadda had a population of 16,121. Males constitute 51% of the population and females 49%. Khadda has an average literacy rate of 58%, lower than the national average of 74%: male literacy is 58%, and female literacy is 55%. In Khadda, 15% of the population is under 6 years of age.
Khadda has 75.05% Hindu population and 24.58% Muslim population.

References

Cities and towns in Kushinagar district